Now That's What I Call Music! is the name given to several different series of various-artists compilation albums.

Now That's What I Call Music! may also refer to three debut albums:
Now That's What I Call Music (original UK album), the very first "Now!" album, released on 10 December 1983 in the UK
Now That's What I Call Music! (original U.S. album), the first album in the U.S. "Now!" series, released on 27 October 1998
Now That's What I Call Music! (Asia), the first album in the Asia "Now!" series, released on 20 July 1995

See also 
 Now That's What I Call Music! discography